Summerhill is a primarily residential area of inner city Dublin, Ireland, on the Northside of the city.  It is located about 500 m to 1,5 km to the east of the O'Connell Street area, roughly in the area bordered by Gardiner Street in the West, Mountjoy Square, Ballybough (and the area of Croke Park and Drumcondra) in the North, Northeast and East, and Talbot Street and Amiens Street (and the area of Connolly Station and the adjacent Docklands) in the South and South East. It also encompasses the historical "Five Lamps" landmark and is located in the East of the Dublin 1 postal district. It is one of the most densely populated and economically deprived areas of the city.

Architecture 
The area is known historically for containing a range of red brick Victorian and Georgian terraced avenues along streets such as Buckingham Street and Gardiner Street as well as for the Monto red-light district of Dublin and the Gloucester Diamond.

History 
In the 19th century, the area became known for tenement housing and later in the 20th century these were mostly replaced with large scale social housing schemes. Streets such as Summerhill Parade were entirely demolished (c. 40 5-storey Georgian houses) and replaced with social housing.  In 1981 alone, approximately 120 Georgian houses were demolished in Summerhill.

In 1992, the sculpture Summerhill Group was unveiled. It is a bronze work on Kilkenny limestone by Cathy Carman and was commissioned by Dublin Corporation as part of the Per Cent for Art Scheme. The work invokes the history of the street, before its redevelopment into a dual carriageway, when children would play on the street.

John Hutton and Sons
For almost 140 years a successful coachbuilding enterprise existed at Summerhill, originally established on nearby Great Britain Street in 1779 by 22-year-old John Hutton, the son of a tannery owner. In 1788 the Lord Lieutenant of Ireland ordered two new mail coaches to be built by Hutton as models, adhering to the design of the patent mail coaches used all over England at the time, effectively granting the company the entirety of the Irish mail coach contract. On the strength of this lucrative contract, the company was enabled to move to larger premises on Summerhill, which it did in 1789. At the time, relocating to Summerhill was considered by many to be a bold move owing to its distance from the great thoroughfares of the city and inevitable lack of trade and business potential. In 1791 the Lord Mayor of Dublin's coach was built, which was still used on ceremonial occasions as of 2004. The business thrived nonetheless, providing coaches to the aristocracy and great families of Ireland before the Acts of Union 1800 shifted the focus of the Irish high society from Dublin to London and new carriages were not required as often. In 1821 George IV granted a royal patent to the company, followed by a royal warrant issued by William IV in 1836 and confirmed by Queen Victoria in 1837. The introduction of the railways as well as the Great Famine led to a decline in the business. Possibly one of the most famous coaches produced by the firm at this time was the Irish State Coach, ordered by Queen Victoria in 1852, which is still used today by the reigning British monarch whenever he/she travels from Buckingham Palace to the Palace of Westminster to formally open the new legislative session of the UK Parliament. 

The company adapted to producing motor cars in the late 1800s. In the early 1920s Huttons turned down the option to take control of the Ford franchise for the whole of the United Kingdom, an error which contributed to Huttons having to file for voluntary liquidation in 1925. The premises at Summerhill was sold to the Dublin United Tramway Company soon after and is now a depot of Dublin Bus.

People
Former or current residents of the area have included:
Todd Andrews, Irish political activist and public servant
John Keegan Casey, Irish poet, orator and republican famous for writing the song "The Rising of the Moon" 
Bill Cullen, Irish businessman and media personality
Thomas Farrell, Irish sculptor
Kellie Harrington, Irish amateur boxer and Olympic gold medallist who grew up in nearby Portland Row
Peadar Kearney, Irish republican and composer
Barry Keoghan, Irish actor
Richard Edmund Meredith (1855-1916), Master of the Rolls in Ireland, Privy Councillor and Judicial Commissioner of the Irish Land Commission
 Kathleen Mulhall, mother of Irish murderers Linda and Charlotte Mulhall, who lived in Richmond Cottages, Summerhill in 2005
Cornelius O'Brien, Irish politician and Member of Parliament
Clementina Robertson, Irish miniature-painter
Terence Wheelock, 20-year old who died on 16 September 2005, from alleged injuries received in custody of An Garda Síochána custody

See also
 List of streets and squares in Dublin

References

Towns and villages in Dublin (city)